Hoboken is an unincorporated community in Marengo County, Alabama, United States.  A post office operated under the name Hoboken from 1877 to 1887.

Geography

References

Unincorporated communities in Alabama
Unincorporated communities in Marengo County, Alabama